James Straus is a special effects artist who was nominated at the 69th Academy Awards for the film Dragonheart in the category of Best Visual Effects. His nomination was shared with Scott Squires, Phil Tippett and Kit West.

He is also an animation supervisor and works at Industrial Light and Magic.

Selected filmography

Alice in Wonderland (2010)
G.I. Joe: The Rise of Cobra (2009)
X-Men Origins: Wolverine (2009)
Nim's Island (2008)
The Mist (2007)
Constantine (2005)
Shrek (2001)
Paulie (1998)
Star Trek: Insurrection (1998)
An American Werewolf in Paris (1997)
Dragonheart (1996)
Jumanji (1995)
The Flintstones (1994)
Jurassic Park (1993)

References

External links

Living people
Special effects people
Year of birth missing (living people)